POŠK (POmorski Športski Klub: Marine Sports Club), is a professional water polo club based in Split, Croatia. The club was founded in 1937. As of 2021–22 season, it competes in the Croatian League and Regional League A2.

History
The club developed in a big name in the world of water polo, especially from the 1980s onwards, during which the national championship of Yugoslavia have been lost many times in points after tough "battles" against the remaining giants of the erstwhile Yugoslav and European water polo as Mladost, Jug, Partizan and Primorac Kotor.

Honours

European competitions
LEN Champions League
 Winners (1): 1998-99
LEN Cup Winners' Cup
 Winners (2): 1981–82, 1983–84
 Runners-up (1): 1979-80
LEN Super Cup
 Winners (1): 1984
 Runners-up (1): 1982
COMEN Cup
 Winners (3): 1984, 1985, 1985

Domestic competitions
Croatian League
 Winners (1): 1997-98
Croatian Cup
 Winners (1): 1999-00
Yugoslav Cup
 Winners (2): 1980, 1982–83

References

Water polo clubs in Croatia
Sport in Split, Croatia
Sports clubs established in 1937